Giuseppe Boschetto (1841–1918)  was an Italian painter, active mainly in Naples, painting often ancient Roman subjects, a thematic often characterized as Pompeian or perhaps, more aptly Neo-Pompeian.

He trained initially with Gustavo Mancinelli; and later with Domenico Morelli, for whom he was a major pupil. His first four or five decades were successful but he engaged his inheritance in some industrial enterprise that led him into poverty. Attempting to become an instructor at the Academy of Fine Arts of Naples, he was rebuffed, and he died indigent in 1918.

He exhibited at the 1880 Turin exhibition, a painting depicting Santa Lucia in Naples. At the 1883 Esposizione Nazionale di Belle Arti of Rome, he exhibited The Death of Socrates. Like Camillo Miola, he applied Realism to historical painting. Other paintings were The proscriptions of Sulla and Agrippina spies on the Senate (exhibited 1877 in Naples).

References

1841 births
1918 deaths
19th-century Italian painters
19th-century Italian male artists
Italian male painters
20th-century Italian painters
20th-century Italian male artists
Painters from Naples
Neo-Pompeian painters